Andy Trouard is a professional American Distance runner who competes in the 5000m for the Oregon Track Club Elite and has a personal best in the event of 13:21.07. In 2018, he won the NCAA Division I National Championship in the 3000m, won two team NCAA national championships in Cross Country with Northern Arizona University in 2016 and in 2017, and is an NCAA All-American in Track and Field.

High school

Junior year 
After competing in swimming and winning two state titles, Trouard decided to go out for Track & Field his junior year, his first time competitively running for his high school. During the season, he would win three state individual titles and quickly become one of the best runners in the state and still had a long way to develop as a runner.

Track & field 
Trouard attended Salpointe Catholic High School, where he competed in track and field his junior and senior year and cross country his senior year. In just year of running track, Trouard posted times of 1:54.54 in the 800m, 4:13.12 in the 1600m, and 9:23.21 in the 3200m. That same season he would go on to win the triple in the 2012 Arizona Division II State Championships in all three distance events, winning the 800m, the 1600m, and the 3200m.

800m 
After running his first 800m of the season at the Ted James Invitational and winning in a time of 2:05.64, he would be headed to the 73rd Chandler Rotary meet in Phoenix, the premier high school track and field meet in Arizona. In a field of 54 individuals, Trouard came in 22nd place, running a 2:01.50, a new personal best but not fast enough to compete for a state title. About a month later, on April 20, Trouard raced at the Mario Castro Invitational verses Ryan Silva, who had run a 4:08 1600m just two weeks prior. Nearly lobbing off seven seconds off his PR, Trouard ran 1:54.54 and came second to Silva, who ran 1:53.65. This being his last 800m of the regular season, Trouard had proved his capabilities and was read for the state championship. He was able to win the race but only by a small margin, 0.11 seconds to be precise. Despite being almost two seconds slower than his season best, Trouard had two other races he had to compete in during the state championships, the 1600m and 3200m.

1600m

3200m

Senior year

Cross country 
In the fall of his senior year, Trouard decided to compete in cross country and ran a season best of 14:59.3 for 5,000m during his sectional race. This time would rank him sixteenth in the nation for the 5,000m and earn him the school record for the distance, but would be broken two years later by his teammate, Nathan Thompson, who ran 14:54.0 on the same course to break his record and would go on to run for the Air Force Academy. The next week, Trouard competed in the Arizona Division II Cross Country Championships and would win by seventeen seconds in a time of 16:02.0 for the 5,000m distance. Two weeks after the state championship, Trouard raced in the Nike Cross Regional South race and placed seventh in a time of 15:09.0 for 5,000m and would qualify him for Nike Cross Nationals as an individual. At NXN, he would place 29th in a time of 17:53.0, forty-seven seconds behind the National Champion, Sam Wharton.

Track & field 

Despite having a superb season time-wise, Trouard did not compete in the Division II State Championships. Part of this great season was the three new school records he set. His new school record were: 1:53.67 in the 800m, 4:08.28 in the 1600m, and 8:51.26 in the 3200m (see image to right).

800m 
Despite the 800m not being Trouard's specialty, he ran two during the regular season and clocked a modest 2:01.21 and a 2:06.21. It wasn't until the state championship until Trouard turned up the speed and ran a 1:53.67, which is what it took to get the win, beating out second place by 0.53 seconds. This time was able to earn him the school record, overshadowing the previous record holder Dave Hohman whose record had stood for twelve years and who held the record with a time of 1:54.52.

1600m 
With new newfound running success on the national stage, Trouard came back for track in the Spring. After a disappointing season opener in the 1600m, running a time of 4:18.15 at the Ted James Invite, he came guns blazing at the first large meet of the year, the 73rd Chandler Rotary meet. In the Varsity Mile, Trouard ran a time of 4:09.71 for the full mile and a 1600m split of 4:08.28. This broke the previous school record of 4:16.34 set by Bryce Livingston in 2006 and would rank him the eleventh fastest miler in the nation by the end of the season.

3200m 
After running a 9:03.81 for the 3200m essentially all alone at the Willie Williams Classic - a new school record, breaking Joe Urbanski's sixteen-year-old record of 9:13.72 - Trouard would be headed to the Arcadia Invitational, a famously fast 3200m because of its great competition as it attracts many of the top two-milers in the nation. This race would be his shot to race with the best in the nation and prove himself as one. At the meet, Trouard placed seventh and ran 8:51.26 for 3200m, demolishing his previous record. This time launched to the seventh ranked spot in the nation and eighth by the end of the season.

College

College bests 
During his time at NAU, Trouard posted some of the best times in the NCAA during the ten seasons he competed in, the majority of which were run in invitational races. In the 2018 indoor season, Trouard had the NCAA indoor lead in the 3000m with a time of 7:48.21 which he ran at the Iowa State Classic where he beat Grant Fisher by 0.35 seconds to secure the win and the NCAA lead. the same year, Trouard was ranked 11th in the 1500m outdoors with a time of 3:41.40. Also, in 2018, Trouard was ranked second in the NCAA in the 5000m during the outdoor season with a time of 13:21.07, only behind Justyn Knight who both ran their season records in the same race, the Jordan Payton Invitational.

Freshman year 
Coming into NAU in 2013, Trouard was listed as their top freshman recruit. During high school he had run times of 1:53.67 in the 800m, 4:08.28 in the 1600m, and 8:51.26 for the 3200m and was ranked among the top in the nation.

Cross country

Indoor track

Outdoor track 
Trouard did not compete during the outdoor season because of an Achilles injury which took many months to rehabilitate. During this time, Trouard was contemplating returning to swimming in the form of Triathlons and began communication with triathlon recruiters before returning to running full-time.

Sophomore year

Cross country 
Trouard did not compete during the Cross Country season as he was continuing rehabilitation on his Achilles (see "Outdoor Track" under 2.1.3 for more information).

Indoor track

Outdoor track

Junior year

Cross country

Indoor track

Outdoor track

Senior year

Cross country

Indoor track

Outdoor track

Footnotes 
* = Track & Field Results Reporting System

References 

Living people
American male long-distance runners
1994 births
Northern Arizona Lumberjacks men's track and field athletes